Wind power in Michigan is a developing industry. The industrial base from the automotive industry has led to a number of companies producing wind turbine parts in the state. The development of wind farms in the state, however, has lagged behind. In January 2021, there were a total of 1,481 wind turbines in the state with a nameplate capacity of 2,549 MW. The nameplate total exceeded 2,000 MW when Pine River came online in March 2019. Wind provided 4.2% of the state's electricity in 2016.

Michigan's requirement for 10 percent renewable energy by 2015 has led to increased alternative development in the state since this law was passed in 2008. A ballot initiative requiring 25% by 2025 failed in 2012.

The development of alternative energy sources has stimulated new businesses and employment. In 2011, the Environmental Law & Policy Center identified more than 100 businesses in Michigan involved in engineering and manufacturing wind turbine components, and employing 4,000 people.

The first commercial wind turbine installed in the state, a 0.6 MW model, was erected in Traverse City in 1996. It remained the only turbine for several years. Traverse City Light & Power has announced a project to generate 30% of its power from renewable sources by 2020. In 2001 Mackinaw City installed 2 turbines rated at 0.6 MW each. Laker Elementary School in the Thumb region installed three 65KW turbines and a 10KW one, totaling 0.2 MW in 2005.

The first wind farm in the state was the Harvest Wind Farm in the Thumb, opened in December 2007, with 32 turbines producing a rated 53 MW. Huron County has the highest number of wind turbines in the state.

In 2010, wind power produced 0.3% of Michigan's electrical power. Installed wind capacity more than doubled in 2011, to a total of 377 MW nameplate capacity.

The largest wind farm in Michigan, the 385 MW Isabella Wind Project developed by Apex Clean Energy and acquired by DTE, entered full operation in 2021.

A number of new projects are proposed in Michigan. In the Thumb region, which has most of Michigan's high-quality onshore wind, 140 miles of new 345 kilovolt lines are being built to allow the region to support hundreds of proposed new turbines.

Michigan has potential for offshore wind power in the Great Lakes, but development has been delayed by political considerations. A proposed wind farm in Lake Michigan at Ludington was rejected in 2010.

Wind farms

Wind generation

 Teal background indicates the largest wind generation month for the year.

 Green background indicates the largest wind generation month to date.

Source:

Michigan used 102,489 GWh in 2016.

See also

Solar power in Michigan
List of power stations in Michigan
Wind power in the United States
Renewable energy in the United States
United States energy law

References

External links 

Map of Michigan wind farms